The 41st New Zealand Parliament was a term of the Parliament of New Zealand. Its composition was determined by the 1984 elections, and it sat until the 1987 elections.

The 41st Parliament was the first term of the fourth Labour Party government. It marked the end of three terms of National Party administration under Robert Muldoon. David Lange become Prime Minister and Roger Douglas became Minister of Finance — the economic reforms undertaken by Douglas, nicknamed Rogernomics, would prove to be a defining feature of the fourth Labour government, and were deeply unpopular with Labour's traditional support base. The National Party, now in opposition, experienced a number of leadership disputes, replacing Muldoon first with Jim McLay and then with Jim Bolger.

The 41st Parliament consisted of ninety-five representatives, the highest number since the 10th Parliament (elected in 1887). All of these representatives were chosen by single-member geographical electorates, including four Māori electorates.

Electoral boundaries for the 41st Parliament

Overview of seats
The table below shows the number of MPs in each party following the 1984 election and at dissolution:

Notes
The Working Government majority is calculated as all Government MPs less all other parties.

Initial composition of the 41st Parliament

By-elections during 41st Parliament 
There were a number of changes during the term of the 41st Parliament.

Summary of changes during term 
 Basil Arthur, the long-serving Labour MP for Timaru, died in 1985. The by-election in Timaru was won by Maurice McTigue of the National Party.

Notes

References 

New Zealand parliaments